Bondel is a residential locality in Mangalore city, Karnataka, India. It is one of the upscale residential localities of Mangalore. Bondel along with Maryhill houses many highrise buildings and also developing rapidly as a commercial center. It lies in Airport road, which originates in KPT Junction and extends till Mangalore International Airport. Kavoor, one of the major localities of Mangalore is located nearby. This locality is close to the airport too.

Daijiworld Media, an Indian private limited media company is headquartered at Bondel, Mangalore.

Notable Educational Institutions nearby
Karnataka (Govt.) Polytechnic, Kadri, Mangalore
Vikas Pre-University College, Mangalore, Maryhill, Mangalore
 Mount Carmel Central School, Maryhill, Mangalore
Shree Devi Group of Colleges, Kenjar, Mangalore
Dr M.V Shetty Group Of Colleges, Kavoor, Mangalore
Womens Polytechnic, Bondel, Mangalore

Notable tourist spots nearby
Kadri Park, Kadri, Mangalore - 
Pilikula Nisargadhama, Mangalore - 
Bejai Museum, Bejai, Mangalore - 
Aloyseum, Hampankatta, Mangalore - 
St. Aloysius Chapel, Hampankatta, Mangalore - 
Tannirbhavi Beach, Mangalore- 
Panambur Beach,  Mangalore - 
NITK Beach, Surathkal, Mangalore - 
Ullal beach, Ullal, Mangalore - 
Sasihithlu Beach, Mukka, Mangalore -

Accessibility 
Bondel is well connected by public transport. There are several city buses (19,13,14 etc.) from the main bus stop in Statebank, Mangalore and other parts of the city.

Nearest Railway Stations:
Mangalore Central railway station, Hampankatta, Mangalore - 
Mangalore Junction railway station, Kankanady, Mangalore - 
Surathkal railway station, Surathkal, Mangalore - 

Nearest Airport:
 Mangalore International Airport (India) -

See also 
 Kadri Manjunath Temple, Kadri, Mangalore
 Gokarnanatheshwara Temple, Kudroli, Mangalore
 Mangaladevi Temple, Bolar, Mangalore
 Shree Sharavu Mahaganapathi Temple, Hampankatta, Mangalore
 St. Lawrence Church, Bondel, Mangalore
 Infant Jesus Shrine, Bikarnakatte, Mangalore
 Bharat Mall, Bejai, Mangalore
 City Centre Mall, K S Rao Road, Mangalore
 Forum Fiza Mall, Pandeshwar, Mangalore

References

Localities in Mangalore